Hoghilag is a commune located in Sibiu County, Transylvania, central Romania. It is composed of three villages, namely: Hoghilag, Prod, and Valchid. The fortified church of Prod was demolished in 1902, while the fortified church of Valchid is still in a relatively good shape.

The commune is located in the northern part of the county, on the border with Mureș County. It is situated on the Transylvanian Plateau, on the right bank of the Târnava Mare River. The nearest town is Dumbrăveni,  to the west on county road DJ142E.

Thousands of tourists attend the annual two-day Tuberoses Festival in Hoghilag.

At the 2011 census, 72% of inhabitants were Romanians, 23.6% Roma, 3.3% Hungarians, and 1% Germans (more specifically, Transylvanian Saxons).

Gallery

References

External links
 

Communes in Sibiu County
Localities in Transylvania